The  Little League World Series took place from August 24 through August 28 in Williamsport, Pennsylvania. Windsor Locks Little League of Windsor Locks, Connecticut, defeated Stoney Creek Little League of Stoney Creek, Ontario, in the championship game of the 19th Little League World Series. , this remains Canada's only championship game appearance.

Teams

Winners bracket

Consolation bracket

References

External links
1965 Little League World Series
Line scores for the 1965 LLWS

Little League World Series
Little League World Series
Little League World Series
August 1965 sports events in the United States